Kelly W. Pease is an American state legislator and Republican member of the Massachusetts House of Representatives from the 4th Hampden district.

See also
 2021–2022 Massachusetts legislature

References

1966 births
People from Hampden County, Massachusetts
Republican Party members of the Massachusetts House of Representatives
Excelsior College alumni
Western New England University alumni
United States Army soldiers
Selectmen in Massachusetts
People from Westfield, Massachusetts
Living people